The floodplain toadlet (Uperoleia inundata) is a species of frog in the family Myobatrachidae.

Habitat 
The floodplain toadlet is endemic to northern Australia ranging from the Timor sea to the gulf of Carpentaria. The floodplain toadlet natural habitats are subtropical or tropical dry forests, subtropical or tropical dry lowland grassland, and intermittent freshwater marshes.

Conservation status 
The population of the species is stable and is on the least concerned list. The species faces no threats.

References

Uperoleia
Amphibians of Queensland
Amphibians of the Northern Territory
Amphibians of Western Australia
Taxonomy articles created by Polbot
Amphibians described in 1981
Frogs of Australia